Joseph Whitaker may refer to:

Joseph Whitaker (industrialist) (1789–1870), American iron master and landowner
Joseph Whitaker (naturalist) (1850–1932), English naturalist
Joseph Whitaker (ornithologist) (1850–1936), Sicilian-English ornithologist, archaeologist and sportsman
Joseph Whitaker (publisher) (1820–1895), English publisher who founded Whitaker's Almanack

See also
Joseph Whitaker School, Nottinghamshire, United Kingdom, named after Joseph Whitaker (naturalist)
Joseph Whittaker (1813–1894), British botanist